This is an annotated list of swimming pools in the United Kingdom which conform to the Olympic standard. Additionally, it lists other long-course facilities that do not quite come up to the full standard of 50 × 25 metres, 10 (middle 8 used) lanes.

At the start of the 21st century, the provision of 50-metre swimming pools in the United Kingdom was very poor for a developed country. Few universities possessed 50-metre pools, and there was a marked reluctance on the part of municipal authorities to build new public long-course facilities. However, the successful bid to hold the 2012 Summer Olympics in London added impetus to the development of new pools. A number of new venues were completed before and after the Games, although some existing pools were demolished and not replaced by 50-metre facilities.

, no university in the UK possesses an Olympic standard pool, though several have an 8-lane 50-metre pool. The Aberdeen Aquatics Centre, being part funded by the University of Aberdeen, is the main pool facility for the university.

Olympic size pools

Planned or under construction

Other 50 metre pools

Planned or under construction/refurbishment

Other notable long-course pools

Open

 Brockwell Lido – 160 ft (48.77 m) open air pool; opened in 1937, closed in 1990, and re-opened in 1994
 Jesus Green Swimming Pool, Cambridge –  open air pool
 Lymington Open Air Sea Water Baths (Lymington Lido) –  open air pool
 Parliament Hill Lido (Hampstead Heath Lido) –  unheated open air pool
 Stonehaven Open Air Pool, Aberdeenshire –  heated seawater open air pool
 Tooting Bec Lido –  unheated open air pool
 Yearsley Swimming Pool, York –  indoor pool

Closed
 Derby Baths, Blackpool – 50 metres x 21 metres (8 lanes), with diving area and 1,800-seater viewing stadium. Opened in 1939 and closed in 1991.
 Broomhill Pool, Ipswich –  open air pool, plus  diving pit. Subject of campaign to reopen.
 Earls Court 1, Earls Court Exhibition Centre.  60m x 30m pool, up to 4m deep.  Opened 1937.  A 750 tonne retractable floor in three sections covered the pool when not in use and is lowered using water hydraulic rams. Demolished along with the rest of the Exhibition site. Last filled with water (2,250,000 gals) as a feature for the Ideal Home Show in 2011. Technical Manager Ray Simpson, who had maintained the pool since 1969, retired in July 2013. Earls Court has hosted both the 1948 and the 2012 Summer Olympics, but swimming was not held there on either occasion. The pool was most closely associated with the Earls Court Boat Show which was held annually from 1960 until 2003.
 Gurnell Leisure Centre, Ealing.  Opened 1981 Closure of the centre 
 Empire Pool, Wembley (now Wembley Arena). Venue for the 1948 Summer Olympics.
Grange Lido, Cumbria. Open-air sea-water Art Deco 50m pool, opened 1932, closed 1993, with an undecided future but a vigorous campaign for its reopening for swimming.
 Leeds International Pool, Leeds – 50 metres, 8 lanes. Closed 21 October 2007; now demolished.
 Murton Colliery Pool, Murton, County Durham – 50 metre open air pool, built in 1961, and closed in 1991 following the closure of the colliery; filled in.
 Wales Empire Pool at Cardiff. Venue for the 1958 British Empire and Commonwealth Games; demolished in 1998 during construction of the Millennium Stadium. Replaced by the Cardiff International Pool.
 White City Stadium swimming pool. Venue for the 1908 Summer Olympics; site demolished in 1985.
 Wigan International Pool, Wigan – 50 metres, 8 lanes. Closed 21 September 2008, and subsequently demolished. Replaced by a 25 × 21 m pool at the Wigan Life Centre.
Coventry Central Baths, Coventry - 50 metres, 8 lanes. Closed 15 February 2020 and will be demolished. Replaced by new 50m pool at Alan Higgs Centre.

See also
List of long course swimming pools in the Republic of Ireland

References

External links
About Olympic and 50 m Swimming pools in the UK and Ireland
Images of Olympic Swimming Pools in the UK
Map of all UK 50m pools from table above

 
Olympic-size swimming pools in the United Kingdom
United Kingdom